The Ministry of Defence (abbreviated MoD) is a government ministry in Myanmar (Burma), responsible for the country's national security and the armed forces (the Tatmadaw). The ministry has the largest share of the national budget among all government ministries, with a budget of $2.289 billion USD in 2013. As part of the Burma Sanctions Program, the United States government prohibits its citizens from doing business with the Ministry of Defence of Myanmar or its affiliates.

Departments
Union Minister Office 
Department of International and Internal Affairs 
Account Office 
Directorate of Procurement

The Ministry of Defence also generates significant revenue from business interests, by owning and operating a large business conglomerate, the Myanmar Economic Corporation (MEC). MEC is owned by the Tatmadaw's Quartermaster General’s Office, and is a direct source of revenue for the Burmese military, even though earnings from MEC are not declared in the ministry's budget.

Minister of Defence

References

External links 

Defence
Myanmar
Military of Myanmar